The name Audrey has been used for four tropical cyclones worldwide.

Atlantic 
 Hurricane Audrey (1957)

Australian region 
 Cyclone Audrey (1964)
 Cyclone Audrey-Bonnie (1969)

Southwest Indian Ocean 
 Moderate Tropical Storm Audrey (1975)

Atlantic hurricane set index articles
South-West Indian Ocean cyclone set index articles